Zabrdo is a small high-elevation settlement in the Municipality of Železniki in the Upper Carniola region of Slovenia.

References

External links

Zabrdo at Geopedia

Populated places in the Municipality of Železniki